Lieutenant-Colonel Peter Frederick Packham (born 1941) is a retired British army officer who also served as Secretary of Middlesex County Cricket Club.

He retired from the British army in 1985 and succeeded Tim Lamb as Secretary of Middlesex County Cricket Club in March 1988. During his tenure of office, Middlesex won the NatWest Trophy at Lord's. He resigned in April 1989 and was replaced permanently by Joe Hardstaff in July 1989.

References

External links
 1941 Births

1941 births
Living people
English cricket administrators
Middlesex Regiment officers
Secretaries of Middlesex County Cricket Club
Queen's Regiment officers